Thomas Gerard Nolan (13 June 1909 – 1969) was an English footballer, noted for his powerful cannonball shots. He was Port Vale's most prolific forward of the 1930s.

Career
Nolan played for Preston North End and Manchester Central, before joining Port Vale in October 1931. He hit 11 goals in 21 games to become the club's top-scorer, helping the "Valiants" to remain in the Second Division on goal average. Nolan then scored eight goals in 17 appearances in 1932–33, including a hat-trick in a 4–1 win over Plymouth Argyle at The Old Recreation Ground on 29 April.

In the 1933–34 season he scored 22 goals in 32 appearances, including hat-tricks in home wins over Bury, Hull City, and Nottingham Forest. He was the club's top-scorer for a second successive season in 1934–35, hitting 16 goals in 40 games. However, he was transferred to Bradford Park Avenue in July 1935. He hit 17 goals in 42 league appearances at Park Avenue, before he returned to Port Vale in a trade for George Stabb in September 1936. The "Valiants" had been relegated to the Third Division North in his absence. He hit 12 goals in 41 appearances in 1936–37, including a hat-trick over eventual league champions Stockport County. He was dropped at the start of the 1937–38 campaign in favour of Jack Roberts, though he still managed to hit the net seven times in his 20 appearances. He hit 17 goals in 41 games in 1938–39 to become the club's top-scorer for a fourth time. In February 1940, Nolan retired from the game due to his war duties. In his two spells with Port Vale he scored 96 goals in 221 appearances, over all competitions.

Career statistics
Source:

References

1909 births
1969 deaths
Footballers from Preston, Lancashire
Military personnel from Preston, Lancashire
English footballers
Association football forwards
Preston North End F.C. players
Manchester Central F.C. players
Port Vale F.C. players
Bradford (Park Avenue) A.F.C. players
English Football League players
British military personnel of World War II